Hans von Wolzogen (1888–1954) was a German film producer and director. He also worked as a production manager on a number of films, his last being Elephant Fury (1953).

Selected filmography

Producer
 One Minute to Twelve (1925)
 The Lady with the Mask (1928)
 Under False Flag (1932)
 The Beaver Coat (1937)
 The Night of Decision (1938)
 Thank You, I'm Fine (1948)
 A Rare Lover (1950)

Production manager
 Light Cavalry (1935)
 Girls in White (1936)
 Daphne and the Diplomat (1937)
 Dangerous Crossing (1937)
 Elephant Fury (1953)

Director
 You Are Adorable, Rosmarie (1934)

References

Bibliography
 Giesen, Rolf. Nazi Propaganda Films: A History and Filmography. McFarland, 2003.
 Kester, Bernadette. Film Front Weimar: Representations of the First World War in German films of the Weimar Period (1919-1933). Amsterdam University Press, 2003.

External links

1888 births
1954 deaths
Film people from Berlin